Douglas Pershing Turley (November 25, 1918 – November 1, 1992) was an American football end in the National Football League for the Washington Redskins.  He attended the University of Scranton.

In 1986, Turley was inducted into the Delaware Sports Museum and Hall of Fame.

1918 births
1992 deaths
People from Nanticoke, Pennsylvania
Players of American football from Pennsylvania
American football wide receivers
Scranton Royals football players
Washington Redskins players
Wilmington Clippers coaches
Wilmington Clippers players